Maicel D. Malone-Wallace (born June 12, 1969 in Indianapolis, Indiana) is an American former track and field athlete who specialised in the 400 meters. She was on the 1996 Olympic Games gold medal winning team in the women's 4 x 400 meters relay for the United States.

Achievements

Note: Results in parenthesis, indicate superior time achieved in the previous round.

References

 
 Maicel Malone-Wallace bio at USATF
 Maicel Malone bio at Seminoles.com

1969 births
Living people
Track and field athletes from Indianapolis
American female sprinters
African-American female track and field athletes
Arizona State Sun Devils women's track and field athletes
Olympic gold medalists for the United States in track and field
Athletes (track and field) at the 1996 Summer Olympics
Athletes (track and field) at the 1991 Pan American Games
World Athletics Championships athletes for the United States
World Athletics Championships medalists
Medalists at the 1996 Summer Olympics
Pan American Games medalists in athletics (track and field)
Pan American Games gold medalists for the United States
Universiade medalists in athletics (track and field)
Goodwill Games medalists in athletics
Universiade gold medalists for the United States
World Athletics Championships winners
Medalists at the 1991 Summer Universiade
Competitors at the 1990 Goodwill Games
Competitors at the 1994 Goodwill Games
Medalists at the 1991 Pan American Games
Olympic female sprinters
World Athletics U20 Championships winners
21st-century African-American people
21st-century African-American women
20th-century African-American sportspeople
20th-century African-American women

Track and field athletes from Indiana